Ram Robert Rahim  is a 1980 Indian Telugu-language masala film directed by Vijaya Nirmala, produced by Uppalapati Suryanarayana Babu and written by Tripuraneni Maharadhi. The film is a remake of the 1977 Hindi film Amar Akbar Anthony. The film stars Krishna, Rajinikanth, Chandra Mohan opposite their female leads of Sridevi, Sunitha and Phataphat Jayalaxmi, with Anjali Devi, Jaggayya and Tyagaraaju in supporting roles. It was released on 31 May 1980. The film was later dubbed and released in Tamil with the same title.

Plot 
Jagdish is a driver. He and his wife live a happy life with three children. He loyally works for his boss, Cunningham. Once Cunningham had caused an accident, he begged Jagdish to take the blame on him. He promises to pay monthly expenses to Jagdish's family. Loyal Jagdish goes to jail. On his release from jail, Jagdish notices that his family is in darkness. On one side he was lying in bed with his wife TB. Poverty, on the other hand, is rampant. His boss goes to Cunningham for help. When Cunningham does not help, he insults Jagdish. In a fit of rage, Jagdish shot Cunningham with a pistol and fled in his car.

Jagdish's wife holds a note in her child's hand and sets out to commit suicide. But fate loses sight of her. Jagadish leaves with his three children. He seats them in a park and moves on. The car gets into an accident. The eldest son falls under a jeep and is picked up by a police officer. The second grows up as an adopted son near the Father in a church. The youngest grows up in a Muslim family. This is how Jagdish's family breaks up. Years pass.

Jagdish becomes a millionaire. The elder, Ram, becomes a responsible police officer. The second grows up to be Robert, the third to be Rahim. Jagdish abducts Cunningham's daughter Rosy and sends her to London for further studies. She returns. Robert loves her. Rahim becomes a good Qawwali singer. He falls in love with a girl named Razia. Ram picks up a girl who pickpockets. As a responsible police officer and puts him on a good path to escape from a hellish life. The three meet but their details are not known to themselves.

Cunningham gets rich again. Cunningham longs to meet his daughter Roji, who was kidnapped by Jagdish as a child. Looks everywhere. Circumstances at the time Rosie finds him make it difficult for Rosie to marry her partner, James.

Robert remembers his father, Jagadish, when his father was killed. Jagdish remembers his wife Rahim, his son, living a life of flowers. Cunningham and his gang hand over Ram, Robert and Rahim in disguise to the police during Rosie's wedding. Jagdish is punished for his mistake and reunites with his wife and children.

Cast

Soundtrack

References

External links 
 

1980s masala films
1980s Telugu-language films
1980 films
Films directed by Vijaya Nirmala
Telugu remakes of Hindi films